Ziauddin Madani was a Sufi also known as Qutb-e-Madina. He lived most of his life in Medina. He was born in 1877 in Sialkot and died on 2 October 1981. He was buried in Al-Baqi. 

He was an Islamic scholar and disciple of Imam Ahmad Raza Khan. He was the spiritual teacher of Ilyas Qadri.

Brief Life 
Ziauddin Madani was born in Sialkot, a city in Pakistan, in 1877 A.D. (1294 AH). He got his early education in Sialkot and Lahore. He studied for four years in Pilibhit (Uttar Pradesh, India) and got his Islamic education under the supervision of Wasee Ahmad Muhaddis Soorti.
He went to Karachi. After some time, travelled to Baghdad, Iraq to take blessings from Ghaus e Azam. He lived for 4 years and then went to Medina in 1900. He stayed in Medina for almost 77 years. He died on 2 October 1981. He is buried in the cemetery of Medina Jannat ul Baqee.

Bay’at and Khilafat 
He took the oath of spiritual allegiance from Imam Ahmad Raza Khan of Bareily, who was claimed by some to be the reviver of the 14th century, of the Qadriya movement of Abdul Qadir Jilani.

See also 

 Imam Ahmad Raza Khan Barelvi

 Ilyas Qadri
 Muhammad Tahir-ul-Qadri

References

Dawat-e-Islami
Muslim missionaries
21st-century Muslim theologians
Sufi mystics
Barelvis
Burials at Jannat al-Baqī